The Bedroom Window is a 1924 American silent mystery film directed by William C. deMille and starring May McAvoy. It was produced by Famous Players-Lasky and distributed through Paramount Pictures.

Cast

Preservation
The film still exists and preserved at the Library of Congress and the UCLA Film and Television Archive.

References

External links

Stills at silentfilmstillarchive.com

1924 films
American silent feature films
Paramount Pictures films
Films directed by William C. deMille
1924 mystery films
American mystery films
American black-and-white films
1920s American films
Silent mystery films
1920s English-language films